This timeline lists all sovereign states in North America (including Central America and the Caribbean), both current and defunct, from the year 1500 onwards.

Timeline

Notes

References

See also
List of predecessors of sovereign states in North America
Timeline of sovereign states in Europe
Timeline of sovereign states in Oceania
Timeline of sovereign states in South America

Timelines of the Americas
History of the Americas
Timelines of North American history
Lists of former countries
Former countries in North America
History of North America
Regional timelines